Oborci is a village in the municipality of Donji Vakuf, Bosnia and Herzegovina.
In Oborci of elementary school called "Third Oborci Elementary School."

Oborci Place is situated in the foothills of the mountains Komar Sovic of Travnik on the road to Donji Vakuf. Location: G. latitude: 44 ° 11 '41 N; G. longitude: 17 ° 25' E. Most of the 9 areas Oborci is extremely hilly. The climate of the area is continental Oboraca - mountain. During the year, the temperature ranges from -20 degrees C to +35 degrees C, with distinct seasons. Plentiful rainfall in the spring and autumn months, and according to official figures ranging from 900 litres to 950 litres per  square metre.
Late Roman basilica in Oborci declared a national monument of Bosnia and Herzegovina 26 January 2004. year .. In the village along the main road Oborci Travnik - Lower Vakuf are the remains of Late Roman basilica. The basilica was built in the mount (Crkvina) a small hill in the midst of the village. It served as a village worship. Due to numerous devastation (of a treasure hunt (!) To individual construction), the remains of the basilica were barely visible, but still bear witness to the settlement developed in the late Roman period.

Demographics 
According to the 2013 census, its population was 607.

References

Populated places in Donji Vakuf